Gerald Boyd may refer to:

 Gerald M. Boyd (1950–2006), American journalist
 Gerald Boyd (British Army officer) (1877–1930)